Larry Lewis Hoppen (January 12, 1951 – July 24, 2012) was an American musician who was a co-founder, vocalist and guitarist/keyboardist of the pop-rock group Orleans. Orleans was formed in Woodstock, New York in January 1972 by Hoppen, vocalist/guitarist/songwriter (and future member of Congress) John Hall, and drummer/percussionist Wells Kelly. In October 1972, Hoppen's younger brother Lance joined the group on bass guitar.  Larry sang lead on Orleans' three biggest hits, "Still the One," "Dance with Me" and "Love Takes Time."

Hoppen died on July 24, 2012, aged 61. His death was implied to be a suicide. The brothers had been scheduled to perform in a concert sponsored by morning TV's Fox & Friends on July 27.  It was subsequently announced that the group's scheduled tour dates would be cancelled.

References

External links
Band's official website

1951 births
2012 deaths
American pop rock singers
American rock guitarists
American male guitarists
Orleans (band) members
Ithaca College alumni
20th-century American guitarists
20th-century American male musicians